Edna Merey-Apinda (Libreville, September 11, 1976) is a Gabonese writer.

Biography
Edna Merey-Apinda grew up in Port-Gentil with her six siblings, her mother was a midwife and her father was an administrative assistant. She took her baccalauréat in France, where she studied commerce in Toulouse.

She currently lives in Port-Gentil, where she works in an oil company.

Works
 Les aventures d'Imya, petite fille du Gabon, Paris, L'Harmattan, 2004
 Ce soir je fermerai la porte, Paris, L'Harmattan, 2006
 Garde le sourire, Paris, Le Manuscrit, 2008
Des contes pour la lune, St Maur, Jets d'Encre, 2010
Ce reflet dans le miroir St Maur, Jets d'Encre, 2011

in October 2011, one of her short story was translated in German for an Austrian magazine, under the title "Es regnet auf die Stadt".

References

https://web.archive.org/web/20120426010659/http://www.podiumliteratur.at/texte/161.htm

External links
  Blog
  www.critiqueslibres.com
  hubertraponda.unblog.fr

1976 births
Living people
Gabonese women writers
People from Ogooué-Maritime Province
21st-century women writers
People from Libreville
21st-century Gabonese people